Andrés Ibargüen may refer to:

Andrés Ibargüen (footballer) (born 1992), Colombian football player
Andrés Ibargüen (basketball) (born 1996), Colombian basketball player